Rigolato is a comune (municipality) in the Province of Udine in the Italian region Friuli-Venezia Giulia, located about  northwest of Trieste and about  northwest of Udine.

Rigolato borders Comeglians, Forni Avoltri, Paluzza, and Prato Carnico.

Demographic evolution

Twin towns
Rigolato is twinned with:

  Bethoncourt, France

References

Cities and towns in Friuli-Venezia Giulia